Xinghua is a town of Qinggang County in western Heilongjiang province, China, located  north-northeast of the county seat. , it has 12 villages under its administration.

See also
 List of township-level divisions of Heilongjiang

References

Township-level divisions of Heilongjiang